No show or no-show or No Show may refer to:

 No show, failure to turn up for a performance
 No-show (airlines), clause of some airlines' terms of service
 No-show (professional wrestling), when a wrestler does not show up for a match
 No-show job, a job for which no work, or even attendance, is expected
 "No Show", the forty-first episode of the HBO television series The Sopranos
 "No Show", single by Regurgitator 2011